Veetla Vishesham is a 2022 Indian Tamil-language comedy-drama film directed by RJ Balaji and NJ Saravanan. It is a remake of the 2018 Hindi film Badhaai Ho. The film is being produced by Boney Kapoor in association with Zee Studios, Bayview Projects LLP and Romeo pictures.

The film was released in theatres by 17 June 2022. It received positive reviews from critics and audiences and became commercial success with praise for the performances of the cast, story and comic timing of main leads.

Plot 
Ilango is 26 years old, working as a biology teacher in a school. He is in a stable relationship with Sowmya, who is the school owner’s daughter in which he's working.  Her mother likes him and approves of their relationship. His father Unnikrishnan ‘Unni’, is a middle-aged man working in the Railways. His mother Krishnaveni is a typical housewife. His younger brother, Anirudh ‘Ani’ is a high-school student. His family resides in the railway quarters, near the train station. Ilango’s grandmother always quarrels with Krishnaveni and dominates over her son, Unni. One day, she taunts Krishnaveni, who gets hurt by her comments. Unni consoles his wife and gets intimate.

17 weeks later, Krishnaveni realises she is pregnant after visiting the doctor. She decides not to abort the child. So Unni announces Krishnaveni’s third pregnancy to the family. The two sons are embarrassed and start to avoid their parents, friends, and society, over the fear of being ridiculed. Unni also tells his mother about Krishnaveni's pregnancy and his mother responds that they must deals with whatever God's desires are. The next day, Unni's mother makes a big scene and asks Krishnaveni to do a tedious work because she was not wearing her hearing aids the night before when Unni broke the news to her.

The news of the pregnancy becomes viral and they are made fun of by family, friends, relatives, and society. Ilango begins to avoid Sowmya. Eventually, he reveals the news of his mum’s pregnancy to Sowmya. Unni and Krishnaveni ask Ilango and Anirudh to go to Kerala for their cousin’s wedding. Both of them refuse by making excuses. This makes Unni angry at them and he leaves them with Krishnaveni and his mother. Meanwhile, Sowmya offers a room date to cheer Ilango up. But he is unable to get intimate with her as it reminds him of his mum’s pregnancy. Sowmya’s mother gets to know about Krishnaveni’s pregnancy from Sowmya. She is shocked and speaks bad about Ilango’s family. Ilango eavesdrops on their conversation and talks harshly with Sowmya’s mum, and breaks up with Sowmya.

At home, Anirudh reveals to Ilango that some boys made fun of him at school and when he responded to them, one of the boys hit him on the face. Ilango and Anirudh then realise their love for their mum and dad. While in Kerala, Unni’s elder sister-in-law and sister teases Krishnaveni for her late pregnancy. For the first time, Unni’s mother defends her daughter-in-law for her dutifulness and makes them realise their selfishness and harsh attitude towards her.

Ilango then reconciles with his parents after their return and begins to fulfil his duties as a son. Krishnaveni realises that Ilango has broken up with Sowmya, and she tells him to apologise to Sowmya’s mother. Ilango reluctantly agrees, for his mother’s sake, and tells that he misses Sowmya, and the reason  he accepted his mum’s pregnancy was because of Sowmya.

After the baby shower, Krishnaveni experiences labour pain and is immediately taken to the hospital where Chief Minister LKG is also admitted due to heart pain. Sowmya’s mother tells her daughter about Ilango’s visit and apology as well as saying that she has forgiven Ilango. Sowmya visits Ilango at the hospital. After the comical/strenuous delivery, the doctor announces the birth of a baby girl.

The family are delighted at the announcement. Later, the family gather around Krishnaveni in joy and take a group selfie with the baby girl.

Cast 

 RJ Balaji as Ilango, Unni's and Krishnaveni's elder son.
 Sathyaraj as Unnikrishnan 'Unni', Ilango's father and Krishnaveni's husband
 Urvashi as Krishnaveni 'Auchu' Unnikrishnan, Ilango's mother and Unni's wife
 Aparna Balamurali as Sowmya, Ilango’s love interest
 K.P.A.C. Lalitha as Ilango's grandmother and Unni's mother
 Visvesh as Anirudh 'Ani', Unni's and Krishnaveni's younger son
 Shivani Narayanan as Shalini Spandana 'Shalu', Ilango's cousin (extended cameo in "Kalyana Paatu" song)
 Seema as Unni's sister-in-law, Shalu's mother
 Pavitra Lokesh as Sowmya's mother
 Ravikumar as Vasu, Unni’s brother
 Pradeep Kottayam as Bijulal
 Rama as Anu, Unni's sister 
 Mayilsamy as Unni's neighbour
 Pugazh as Amal Tailor, Ilango's friend
 George Maryan as Dr. George
 Deepa Shankar as Deepa, Unni's neighbour
 Kamala Kamesh as Dr. Jenny, the gynaecologist
 Kavithalayaa Krishnan as Varadharajan
 Nakkalites Dhanam as Dhanam, Unni's Neighbour
 Sangeetha Venkatesh as Unni’s neighbour
 Jagan Krishnan as Ilango's friend
 Mullai as Narayana
 Nishesh as Student
 Yogi Babu as NEET coaching center owner 
 Oru Viral Krishna Rao as  Saurimuthu (in photograph)

Production 
The film is being directed by NJ Saravanan and RJ Balaji. The technical crew includes Selva R. K. and Girishh G. as editor and musician respectively, who both collaborated earlier for Mookuthi Amman. Meanwhile, Karthik Muthukumar was brought for the film's cinematography. RJ Balaji will be playing the role played by Ayushmann Khurrana,Aparna Balamurali of Sanya Malhotra, Urvashi of Neena Gupta, KPAC Lalitha of Surekha Sikri, Sathyaraj of Gajraj Rao played in the original.

Music
The music rights of the film are owned by Zee Music Company. The music of the film is composed by Girishh Gopalakrishnan and lyrics are written by Pa. Vijay.

Release

Promotion
The movie cast RJ Balaji and Aparna Balamurali appeared as a guests in Pudhu Pudhu Arthangal television series, which was broadcasting on Zee Tamil for promoting the film. The series current track is also like the film where an aged woman having a baby.

Theatrical
The film was for a theatrically released on 17 June 2022.

Home media
The post-theatrical streaming rights of the film was bought by ZEE5 and the satellite rights of the film was bought by Zee Tamil and Zee Thirai. The film was digitally streamed on ZEE5 from 15 July 2022.

Reception

Critical Response 
Bhuvanesh Chandar of The Hindu said, "It is also a film that seems to be introducing to audiences what one might assumed as the ‘RJ Balaji Cinematic Universe’ (RJBCU)". Pinkvilla Desk of Pinkvilla said, "This family drama is worth watching for some of the aspects that are highlighted when compared to the original". M. Suganth of The Times of India who gave 3.5 stars out of 5 stars after reviewing the film stated that "The duo manages to smoothen out these wrinkles with help from Girishh Gopalakrishnan's emotive score that elevates the emotions in the dramatic scenes". Indiaglitz who gave 3.25 stars out of 5 stars after reviewing the film stated that "An adorable family drama laced with humour". Haricharan Pudipeddi of Hindustan Times said, "The Tamil remake of Badhaai Ho is a well-made entertaining film that manages to not just be good on its own but even stands up to the National Award-winning original.". Sudhir Srinivasan of Cinema Express who gave 3 stars out of 5 stars after reviewing the film stated that "When a film shows heart, you can excuse a loss of finesse, I think". Soundarya Athimuthu of The Quint who gave 3.5 stars out of 5 stars after reviewing the film stated that "Veetla Vishesham works both as an improvised remake if you already saw the Hindi original, and as a stand-alone film when watched with a pair of fresh eyes".Maalai Malar critic gave 3.75 rating out of 5 and noted that " RJ Balaji, who is playing the lead role in the film, has given a comedy and sarcasm performance in his own style. Especially in the film, he has attracted more attention in the sentimental scenes."

However, Nakkheeran critic stated that " Otherwise, if people who have not seen Hindi films watch this film, it will be an enjoyable film with a good concept".Dinamalar critic gave 3.25 rating out of 5.

Box Office 
Overall, the film has collected over approximately Rs 13 crore at the box office.

References 

2022 films
2020s Tamil-language films
Tamil remakes of Hindi films